The 2020 Russian Super Cup was the 18th annual Russian Super Cup match which was contested between 2019–20 Premier League champions and Cup winners Zenit Saint Petersburg against the Premier League runners-up, Lokomotiv Moscow. The final was played at VEB Arena. Attendance was limited due to the COVID-19 pandemic in Russia.

Lokomotiv Moscow were the defending champions.

Match details

MATCH OFFICIALS
 Assistant referees:
Roman Usachyov
 Aleksei Vorontsov
Fourth official:
  Pavel Kukuyan
Video assistant referee:
 Vitali Meshkov

References

2020–21 in Russian football
Russian Super Cup
FC Zenit Saint Petersburg matches
FC Lokomotiv Moscow matches
August 2020 sports events in Russia
2020 in Moscow
Football in Moscow